Aitor Silloniz (born 17 February 1977) is a Spanish former road cyclist, who competed as a professional for  from 1999 to 2005. His brother Josu was also a professional cyclist. He competed in the 2004 Vuelta a España.

Major results
1998
 1st Stage 4 Circuito Montañes
 2nd Overall Ronde de l'Isard
1999
 1st Stage 1 Gran Premio Internacional Mitsubishi MR Cortez
2001
 1st Stage 3 Setmana Catalana de Ciclisme
2002
 4th Overall Tour de l'Avenir
1st Stage 7

References

External links

1977 births
Living people
Spanish male cyclists
People from Amorebieta-Etxano
Cyclists from the Basque Country (autonomous community)
Sportspeople from Biscay